Quyichirchiq is a district of Tashkent Region in Uzbekistan. The capital lies at the city Doʻstobod. The district consists of one city (Doʻstobod), 2 urban-type settlements (Qoʻrgʻoncha, Paxtazor) and 9 rural communities (Gul, Ketmontepa, Maydontol, Qoʻrgʻoncha, Maʻnaviyat, Maʻrifat, Oʻzbekiston, Toshovul, Toshloq).

References

Districts of Uzbekistan
Tashkent Region